Ryzhov is a Russian male surname, its feminine counterpart is Ryzhova. It may refer to:
 Alexander Ryzhov (general) (1895-1950), Soviet World War II general
 Aleksandr Ryzhov (born 1997), Russian association football player
 Dmitri Ryzhov (born 1989), Russian association football player
 Ivan Ryzhov (1913–2004), Russian film and theater actor
 Mikhail Ryzhov (footballer) (born 1981), Russian football player
 Mikhail Ryzhov (racewalker) (born 1991), Russian racewalker
 Yuri Ryzhov (1952–2015), Russian association football player
 Antonina Ryzhova (1934–2020), Russian volleyball player
 Kseniya Ryzhova (born 1987), Russian sprinter

Russian-language surnames